The Helsinki Prison, also known as the Sörnäinen Prison (earlier known as Helsinki Central Prison) is a prison located in the Hermanninmäki district of Helsinki, Finland, opened in 1881. At the moment it is the only prison operating in Helsinki proper after the Katajanokka prison was converted to a hotel and its inmates transferred to a new prison in Vantaa, a suburban municipality.

Prisons in Finland
Buildings and structures in Helsinki
Sörnäinen